Cocoon of Love is the debut album of Los Angeles indie pop band Princeton. The album was released on September 29, 2009, on Kanine Records.

Track listing 
 "Sadie and Andy" – 3:36
 "Show Some Love, When Your Man Gets Home" - 3:51
 "Calypso Gold" - 3:44
 "Korean War Memorial" - 4:02
 "Stunner Shades in Heaven" - 4:11
 "Martina and Clive Krantz" - 2:47
 "Shout it Out" - 2:41
 "Sylvie" - 3:36
 "I Left My Love in Nagasaki" - 4:12
 "Worried Head" - 2:56
 "The Wild" - 3:45

References

External links 
 Official website

2009 debut albums
Constellation Records (Canada) albums
Kanine Records albums